Hans-Rudolf Wiedemann (February 16, 1915 - August 4, 2006) was a German pediatrician, University teacher and autograph collector.


Life
Wiedemann was born in Bremen. His father was a medical practitioner. His mother came from a medical family. Wiedemann studied medicine at the University of Freiburg, the University of Munich, the University of Hamburg, the University of Lausanne and the University of Jena.

In 1940, Wiedemann passed the state examination. With a doctoral thesis with Yusuf Ibrahim he was appointed doctor of medicine in 1941 in Jena. In Jena, he wrote and researched jaundice. He continued with specialist training  in Bremen, Bonn and Münster. As director of the Krefeld Children's Hospital, Wiedemann was one of the first to recognise the fatal side effects of thalidomide. While initially considered safe, thalidomide was responsible for teratogenic deformities in children born after their mothers used it during pregnancies, prior to the third trimester. In November 1961, thalidomide was taken off the market due to massive pressure from the press and public.

The University of Kiel appointed Wiedemann in 1961 as Chairman of Pediatrics. In 1977, he was chairman of the German Society for Paediatrics Medicine. In 1980 he became professor emeritus. Wiedemann collected and wrote several books about autographs with his wife Gisela von Sybel. 

Wiedemann died in Kiel in 2006.

Honors
Among his honors are:
Member of the German Academy of Sciences Leopoldina (1969)

Honorary member of the German Society for Pediatrics (1982)

Wiedemann–Steiner syndrome (named after)

Beckwith–Wiedemann syndrome (named after)

Genée–Wiedemann syndrome (named after)

The world of autographs - Gisela and Hans-Rudolf Wiedemann. German Schiller Society, Marbach am Neckar 1994.

References

German geneticists
German pediatricians
1915 births
2006 deaths
University of Freiburg alumni
Ludwig Maximilian University of Munich alumni
University of Hamburg alumni
University of Lausanne alumni
University of Jena alumni
Academic staff of the University of Kiel